U with acute (У́ у́; italics: У́ у́) is a letter of the Cyrillic script. In its lowercase forms it looks exactly like the Latin letter Y with acute (Ý ү́ Ý ү́).

Usage
 and other stressed (accented) vowels are often being used in East Slavic languages like in some words like у́же, тру́сы, в ду́ше, заплачу́, etc.

Words longer than one syllable in these languages carry accents and these are fundamental – accentuated vowels are pronounced with more intensity and do not change their sound within words.

These words use sometimes these letters so they can have a more understandable pronunciation are used to make a different meaning.

Related letters and other similar characters
U u : Latin letter U
Ú ú : Latin letter U with acute – a Czech, Faroese, Hungarian, Icelandic, and Slovak letter
Y y : Latin letter Y
Ý ý : Latin letter Y with acute - a similar looking letter
У у : Cyrillic letter U
Ў ў : Cyrillic letter Short U
Ӱ ӱ : Cyrillic letter U with diaeresis
Ӳ ӳ : Cyrillic letter U with double acute
Ү ү : Cyrillic letter straight U
Ү́ ү́ : Cyrillic letter straight U with acute
Ұ ұ : Cyrillic letter Straight U with stroke
Cyrillic characters in Unicode

Computing codes
Being a relatively recent letter, not present in any legacy 8-bit Cyrillic encoding, the letter У́ is not represented directly by a precomposed character in Unicode either; it has to be composed as У+◌́ (U+0301).

References

Letters with acute
Cyrillic letters with diacritics